Attilio Valobra (1892 – 1956) was an Italian footballer who played as a midfielder. On 15 June 1913, he represented the Italy national football team on the occasion of a friendly match against Austria in a 2–0 away loss.

References

1892 births
1956 deaths
Italian footballers
Italy international footballers
Association football midfielders
Juventus F.C. players
Torino F.C. players